Tim Carey (born February 20, 1975) is a former American football quarterback who played four seasons in the Arena Football League (AFL) with the New England Sea Wolves, Chicago Rush and Buffalo Destroyers. He played college football at Stanford and Hawaii.

Early years
Carey played high school football for the Los Alamitos High School Griffins of Los Alamitos, California. He recorded 3,397 passing yards his senior season.

College career
Carey was a member of the Stanford Cardinal football team of Stanford University from 1993 to 1995. He transferred to play for the Hawaii Rainbow Warriors of the University of Hawaii at Manoa from 1996 to 1997.

Professional career
Carey signed with the AFL's New England Sea Wolves on March 13, 2000. He played for the Chicago Rush of the AFL from 2001 to 2002. He signed with the Buffalo Destroyers of the AFL on November 27, 2002.

References

External links
Just Sports Stats
College stats

Living people
1975 births
Players of American football from California
Sportspeople from Orange County, California
American football quarterbacks
Stanford Cardinal football players
Hawaii Rainbow Warriors football players
New England Sea Wolves players
Chicago Rush players
Buffalo Destroyers players
People from Los Alamitos, California